Archechiniscus is the only genus of tardigrades in the family Archechiniscidae. It was first described by Erich Schulz in 1953.

Species
The genus includes the following species:

 Archechiniscus bahamensis Bartels, Fontoura & Nelson, 2018
 Archechiniscus biscaynei Miller, Clark & Miller, 2012
 Archechiniscus marci Schulz, 1953
 Archechiniscus minutus Grimaldi de Zio & D'Addabbo Gallo, 1987
 Archechiniscus symbalanus Chang & Rho, 1998

References

Further reading

 Binda,  Risistemazione di alcuni tardigradi con l'istituzione di un nuovo genere di Oreellidae e della nuova famiglia Archechiniscidae. (1978) Animalia (Catania), 1978, vol. 5, no. 1/3, p. 307-314.
 Schulz  Eine neue Tardigraden-Gattung von der pazifischen Küste. Zoologischer Anzeiger, 1953, vol. 151 p. 306-310
 Nomenclator Zoologicus info

Tardigrade genera
Arthrotardigrada